John Henniker-Major, 4th Baron Henniker (3 February 1801 – 16 April 1870), also 1st Baron Hartismere in the Peerage of the United Kingdom, was a British peer and Member of Parliament. He was educated at Eton College and St John's College, Cambridge.

Henniker was the son of John Minnet Henniker Major, 3rd Baron Henniker. He succeeded his father as fourth Baron Henniker in July 1832 but as this was an Irish peerage it did not entitle him to a seat in the House of Lords. In December of the same year he was instead elected to the House of Commons for the newly created constituency of East Suffolk, which he represented until 1846 and again from 1856 to 1866. The latter year he was created Baron Hartismere, of Hartismere in the County of Suffolk, in the Peerage of the United Kingdom. This title gave him and his descendants an automatic seat in the House of Lords. He was appointed High Sheriff of Suffolk in 1849.

Lord Henniker married Anna, daughter of Lieutenant-General Sir Edward Kerrison, 1st Baronet, in 1836.

Hon. Mary Henniker-Major (12 Aug 1838 – 20 Jul 1902). Died unmarried.
John Major Henniker-Major, 5th Baron Henniker of Stratford-upon-Slaney (7 Nov 1842 – 27 Jun 1902)
Hon. Anne Helen Henniker-Major (4 Dec 1844 - 1907). Died unmarried.
Hon. Edward Minet Henniker-Major (3 Feb 1848, d. 20 Dec 1924). He married a French captain's daughter, Eveline Talavera de St. Maur. No known issue.
Maj.-Gen. Hon. Arthur Henry Henniker-Major (3 Apr 1855 – 6 Feb 1912). He married the Hon. Florence Ellen Hungerford Milnes, daughter of Richard Monckton Milnes, 1st Baron Houghton. They had no issue.

He died at 6 Grafton Street, Mayfair, on 16 April 1870, aged 69, and was succeeded in his titles by his son John. Lady Henniker died in 1889.

Notes

References 
Kidd, Charles, Williamson, David (editors). Debrett's Peerage and Baronetage (1990 edition). New York: St Martin's Press, 1990,

External links 
 

Henniker, John Henniker-Major, 4th Baron
Henniker, John Henniker-Major, 4th Baron
People educated at Eton College
Alumni of St John's College, Cambridge
Hartismere, John Henniker-Major, 1st Baron
Henniker, John Henniker-Major, 4th Baron
Members of the Parliament of the United Kingdom for English constituencies
Eldest sons of British hereditary barons
UK MPs 1832–1835
UK MPs 1835–1837
UK MPs 1837–1841
UK MPs 1841–1847
UK MPs 1852–1857
UK MPs who were granted peerages
UK MPs who inherited peerages
Peers of the United Kingdom created by Queen Victoria
Barons Henniker